Meridian School District may refer to:
Meridian Public School District, Meridian, Mississippi
Meridian School District (Idaho)
Meridian School District (Washington)